The Oath of Pierre is a 1913 American silent short film directed by Sydney Ayres starring William Garwood and Charlotte Burton. The film was based on a story by M.H. McKinstry.

Cast
Charlotte Burton as Julia Naughton, of the border line 
William Garwood as Pierre Dorchet, a young trapper
King Clark as John Kent, his assistant  
Louise Lester as Mrs. Naughton 
Jack Richardson as Calvin Crow, government surveyor 
Vivian Rich  as Nanette Dorchet, Pierre's sister
Harry von Meter as Papineau, friend of Pierre

External links

1913 drama films
1913 films
Silent American drama films
American silent short films
American black-and-white films
Films directed by Sydney Ayres
1913 short films
1914 drama films
1914 films
1910s American films